Calyptrochilum aurantiacum  is a plant species in the family Orchidaceae. It is endemic to Cameroon. Its natural habitat is subtropical or tropical moist lowland forests. It is threatened by habitat loss.

References

Angraecinae
Endemic orchids of Cameroon
Critically endangered plants
Taxobox binomials not recognized by IUCN